David Clifford Salvian (born September 9, 1955) is a Canadian retired professional ice hockey right winger who played in one National Hockey League playoff game for the New York Islanders during the 1976–77 NHL season, a playoff game on April 7, 1977 against the Chicago Black Hawks.

Career statistics

Regular season and playoffs

See also
List of players who played only one game in the NHL

External links

1955 births
Living people
Canadian ice hockey right wingers
Dallas Black Hawks players
Fort Wayne Komets players
Fort Worth Texans players
Houston Aeros draft picks
New York Islanders draft picks
New York Islanders players
St. Catharines Black Hawks players
Ice hockey people from Toronto